Lars Knutzon (born 1 October 1941) is a Danish actor and director, best known to international audiences for his role in the Danish TV drama Borgen.

He is the son of actor, director and theatre director Per Knutzon and cabaret singer Lulu Ziegler and was trained in acting at the Odense Theatre in 1967 and was then employed by the theatre.

Lars Knutzon has worked for many years as director and actor in a number of Danish theatre and has also played a number of roles in TV, on radio and in film. 
 
On the stage he has appeared in A Midsummer Night's Dream, As You Like It, Don Quixote, Koks i Kulissen, Waiting for Godot, Woyzeck, Slutspil and Hamlet.
 
On television Knutzon has appeared in Krøniken, TAXA, A great family, Ludo, Kald mig-Liva, Bryggeren, all four seasons of Borgen. and Christmas series Nissebanden, Alletiders Nisse and Jul in Kronborg.

Selected films 

 Gertrud – 1964
 Jensen længe leve – 1965
 Den gale dansker – 1969
 Det gode og det onde – 1975
 Hjerter er trumf – 1976
 Verden er fuld af børn – 1980
 Med lille Klas i kufferte – 1983
 Kurt og Valde – 1983
 Lykken er en underlig fisk – 1989
 Viktor og Viktoria – 1993
 Hjælp - Min datter vil giftes – 1993
 Kun en pige – 1995
 Ørnens øje – 1997
 TAXA – 1999 
 Toast  – 1999 
 I Wonder Who's Kissing You Now – 1998
 Albert – 1998
 Manden som ikke ville dø – 1999
 En kort en lang – 2001
 Oh Happy Day – 2004
 Det grå guld – 2010 
 Borgen – 2010 - 2012

References

External links
 

1941 births
Danish male actors
Living people